Northwest Highway is a major highway/road in the Dallas-Fort Worth Metroplex area of Texas. The highway was originally built as the route of State Highway 114 (SH 114) into Dallas. The road has been the site of major development for almost half a decade, especially in Dallas. The route is known as other names at various points. This includes Northwest Parkway (SH 114 from SH 170 to the Dallas county line) and Northwest Drive in Mesquite.

Route description

SH 114 and Bus. SH 114-L
Northwest Highway begins at SH 170 at the Westlake-Trophy Club line. Here, the highway is known as Northwest Parkway. The highway runs through Southlake and leaves SH 114 onto the Grapevine business route, Bus. SH 114-L. The Grapevine segment is the first to be signed as Northwest Highway. The highway has a short concurrency with SH 26 in the eastern part of town. Northwest rejoins SH 114 (which is concurrent with SH 121) near the north entrance of Dallas/Fort Worth International Airport. SH 121 leaves at the next exit towards Lewisville and onto the  Sam Rayburn Tollway.

At the Dallas-Tarrant county line, the highway's name becomes the John W. Carpenter Freeway, into Irving. The highway crosses the President George Bush Turnpike and leaves 114 shortly after this. Northwest traverses onto Spur 348.

Spur 348, Loop 12 and Spur 244
All 3.9 miles of Spur 348 runs along Northwest Highway from SH 114 to Loop 12. Spur 348 was designated on February 22, 1961, from Loop 12 to IH-35E. On January 1, 1971, Spur 348, as well as the old route of SH 114, became part of rerouted Loop 12, while Spur 348 was reassigned to the route from Loop 12 to SH 114 along the old location of SH 114. The old route of Loop 12 became Spur 482. Loop 12 joins Northwest Highway from the south just west of I-35E. The Loop 12 section is the busiest part of the highway. In the western part of the Loop 12 segment, Northwest runs along the north shore of Bachman Lake, which is just north of Love Field. After the Dallas North Tollway intersection, Northwest Highway runs past Preston Hollow (whose town hall was located on NW HWY before being annexed by Dallas in 1945)  and then forms the northern border of University Park and interchanges with US 75 near Northpark Mall. Loop 12 leaves the highway to the south just northeast of White Rock Lake where the Spur 244 designation begins. Spur 244 ends at SH 78 (Garland Road) just short of I-635. All 2.9 miles of Spur 244 is signed as Northwest Highway. Spur 244 was designated on June 21, 1951 on its current route.

Garland Road to Belt Line Road
After passing under I-635, Northwest Highway enters Garland. The highway follows an east-west run to Centerville Road, where it turns to the southeast. After the La Prada Drive intersection, Northwest Highway enters Mesquite as Northwest Drive. The road changes directions again, back to an eastbound route, at I-30. The road travels for about another mile before ending at Belt Line Road.

Junction list
NOTE: There are no mileposts along this highway.

References

Transportation in Denton County, Texas
Transportation in Tarrant County, Texas
Transportation in Dallas County, Texas